Colossus of the Arena (also known as Death on the Arena) is a 1962 Italian peplum film directed  by Michele Lupo and starred by Mark Forest.

Plot

A powerful man posing as a gladiator in Rome's fourth century discovers a plan to put the beautiful Queen in prison, which he thwarts by exposing a sinister duke as a traitor.

Cast   
Mark Forest as  Maciste/Colossus
Scilla Gabel as  Talima
José Greci as  Resia
 Germano Longo as  Ligonius
Erno Crisa as  Oniris
Dan Vadis as  Sidone
Harold Bradley as  Tuco
Carlo Pisacane as  oste
Vittorio Sanipoli as  Slavo
 Alfio Caltabiano as  Psychios 
 Sal Borgese  as  Gladiator

References

External links
https://www.imdb.com/title/tt0154805/?ref_=nv_sr_srsg_0
   
Peplum films 
1962 adventure films
Films directed by Michele Lupo
Films scored by Francesco De Masi
Maciste films
Sword and sandal
Sword and sandal films
1960s Italian films